Srikant Murali (also spelt Srikanth Murali) is an Indian actor, director and ad filmmaker. He has been in Malayalam movies such as Home(2021), Aby (2017), Virus (2019) and Action Hero Biju (2016). As an ad filmmaker Srikant has created material in various Indian languages.

Career
Srikant started his career with K. G. George as his assistant in the year 1988, when he was 16 years. After completing his graduation in Chemistry from M G University, Srikant Murali himself started doing short films and documentaries for DD TVM in 1992. Hails from a traditional Kerala family, he is a well trained Kadhakali artist, proved his caliber both in art and literature during his school and college days. Srikant has joined as assistant to Mr Priyadarshan, the ace film director and producer in the year 1996, and worked with him for his all film ventures until 2006. He started working as a free lance film maker, later launched his own production house called “Mindscape productions” in 2008.

In 2016 he has started his acting career. In 2017 in his directorial debut Aby he portrayed the life of Saji Mathew who wants to fly an aeroplane. The movie depicts how the hero struggles to make his dream come true and the obstacles he faces on his way to success and achieve glory. Srikant also has worked in popular movies like Chathur Mukham, Forensic, Under World and Ente Mezhuthiri Athazhangal etc.

Srikant has also worked as the eviction director for BIGG BOSS MALAYALAM SEASON 01 & 02.

Filmography

As director

As actor

References

External links
 

Living people
Malayalam film directors
Malayali people
1971 births